The women's tournament of football at the 2019 Summer Universiade was held in July in Naples, Italy.

Teams

Preliminary round
All times are in Central European Summer Time (UTC+02:00).
Tiebreakers
The ranking of each team in each group was determined as follows:
Greatest number of points obtained in group matches;
Goal difference in all group matches;
Greatest number of goals scored in all group matches;
Greatest number of points obtained in group matches between the teams concerned;
Greatest number of goals scored in the group matches between the teams concerned;
Fair play points system taking into account the number of yellow and red cards in all group matches;
Drawing of lots by the Technical Committee.

Group A

Group B

Group C

Group D

Classification round

9th–12th place semifinals

11th place match

9th place match

Elimination round

Quarterfinals

5th–8th place semifinals

Semifinals

7th place match

5th place match

Bronze medal match

Gold medal match

References

External links
Official Site

2019
Women
International women's association football competitions hosted by Italy
2019 in Italian women's sport
2019 in women's association football